Allan Odhiambo (born 16 September 1971) is a Kenyan footballer. He played in eleven matches for the Kenya national football team from 1992 to 1996. He was also named in Kenya's squad for the 1992 African Cup of Nations tournament.

References

1971 births
Living people
Kenyan footballers
Kenya international footballers
1992 African Cup of Nations players
Place of birth missing (living people)
Association footballers not categorized by position